In Greek mythology, the name Eleius (Ancient Greek:  Ἠλεῖος)  may refer to:

Eleius, son of Poseidon and Eurycyda. When Aetolus, his maternal uncle, was sent into exile, Eleius became king of the Epeans (who had received their original name from his other uncle, Epeius) and renamed his people the Eleans after himself, and the land was accordingly named Elis. He had a son Augeas.
Eleius, a descendant of the precedent (the lineage is as follows: Eleius I - Augeas - Agasthenes - Polyxenus - Amphimachus - Eleius II), and also king of Elis. It was during his reign that the Heracleidae assembled under the leadership of Aristomachus' sons to attempt to return to Peloponnesus.
Eleius, son of Tantalus and another possible eponym of Elis.

Notes

References 

 Pausanias, Description of Greece with an English Translation by W.H.S. Jones, Litt.D., and H.A. Ormerod, M.A., in 4 Volumes. Cambridge, MA, Harvard University Press; London, William Heinemann Ltd. 1918. . Online version at the Perseus Digital Library
 Pausanias, Graeciae Descriptio. 3 vols. Leipzig, Teubner. 1903.  Greek text available at the Perseus Digital Library.
 Stephanus of Byzantium, Stephani Byzantii Ethnicorum quae supersunt, edited by August Meineike (1790-1870), published 1849. A few entries from this important ancient handbook of place names have been translated by Brady Kiesling. Online version at the Topos Text Project.

Kings of Elis
Kings in Greek mythology
Children of Poseidon
Demigods in classical mythology
Elean characters in Greek mythology
Elean mythology